Sindhi Pathan (Sindhi: پٺاڻ) is the name of Pashtun communities living in Sindh for centuries which have adopted norms and culture of Sindh.

Many bear the tribes Naghar, Agha and Kakar. The vast majority of Sindhi Pathans originate from Quetta and southern Afghanistan, and a few come from Khyber Pakhtunkhwa. Shikarpur, New Zarkhail, Pir Bux Wandh, Garhi Yasin, Sultan Kot Shahpur Chakar whereas others live in other urban, sub-urban and rural areas of Sindh. The tribes most commonly to be found in the Sindh region are the Tareen, Muhammadzais, Niazai, Kundi, Miana, Bangash, Yusufzai, Hassan Zai, Mandanr, Lodhi, Kakar, Sherwani, Orakzai, Sulemankhel sulemani, Afridi, Khattak Kakazai, Karlanri, Barakzai, Khizerzai, Babar and the Zamand Pathans.

Moreover, a large minority of Pashto-speaking Pashtuns exist in the cities of Karachi and to a lesser extent Interior Sindh who have migrated after around the 60s and 70s and even a smaller number of these Pashtuns being Afghan Refugees. Also, it's estimated that 30-35% of the Urdu-speaking Muhajirs of Karachi and Hyderabad make a claim to the ancestry of Pashtuns that mostly had assimilated into North Indian culture. They have arrived to the cities post the India/Pakistan partition. Pashto-speaking Pashtuns are distinct from ancestrally Pashtun Urdu-speaking Muhajirs as well as ancestrally Pashtun Sindhi-speakers.

Notable people
 Agha Siraj Durrani, Speaker of the Provincial Assembly of Sindh
 Salma Agha, British Pakistani singer and actress.
 Nuzhat Pathan, member of the National Assembly of Pakistan
 Junaid Jamshed, singer, naat khuwan and religious preacher
 Fawad Khan, actor and model
 Bilal Abbas Khan, actor
 Sahir Lodhi, actor
 Shaista Lodhi, doctor, actress, and television host
 Minal Khan, actress.
 Aiman Khan, actress.
Rafiq Ghaznawi, musician and actor of British Indian era.
Mahira Khan, actress and VJ.
Ayeza Khan, actress

References

See also
 Agha Javed Pathan
 Agha Siraj Durrani

Social groups of Pakistan
Sindhi tribes
Pashtun diaspora